Dale Mason (born 28 August 1974) is a Barbadian cricketer. He played in one first-class match for the Barbados cricket team in 1999/00.

See also
 List of Barbadian representative cricketers

References

External links
 

1974 births
Living people
Barbadian cricketers
Barbados cricketers
People from Saint Philip, Barbados